Opharus aeschista is a moth of the family Erebidae. It was described by Paul Dognin in 1911. It is found in Colombia.

References

Opharus
Moths described in 1911
Moths of South America